David Brent Nail (born May 18, 1979) is an American country music artist, and frontman of the band David Nail & The Well Ravens. In 2002, he debuted the single "Memphis" from an unreleased album for Mercury Records Nashville. Five years later, he signed with MCA Nashville, for which he has released four studio albums: I'm About to Come Alive, The Sound of a Million Dreams, I'm a Fire, and Fighter plus two extended plays, 1979 and Uncovered. The albums have produced seven chart entries on Hot Country Songs and Country Airplay, including two that have reached No. 1: "Let It Rain" (featuring Sarah Buxton) and "Whatever She's Got", plus the top 10 hit "Red Light".

Musical career
David Nail's first recording contract was with Mercury Records Nashville, a division of Universal Music Group Nashville. While there, he recorded a self-titled debut album, which was produced by Keith Stegall and John Kelton. The lead-off single, "Memphis", reached number 52 on the Billboard Hot Country Singles & Tracks (now Hot Country Songs) charts. Deborah Evans Price gave the song a mostly-positive review, calling it a "solid performance" but saying that she considered its storyline implausible. Advance copies of the album were sent to radio stations, but it was not commercially released. He also sang backing vocals on the track "But I Can't Let You Go" on then-labelmate Meredith Edwards' 2001 album Reach.

I'm About to Come Alive and The Sound of a Million Dreams (2007–2012)
Nail signed to MCA Records Nashville, also a division of Universal Music Group Nashville, in April 2007. His debut album for the label, I'm About to Come Alive, was produced by Frank Liddell and Mike Wrucke, the same producers who work with Miranda Lambert. The album includes a duet with Lambert, co-writes with Kenny Chesney and Rascal Flatts' lead singer Gary LeVox, and five songs that Nail co-wrote.

The first single was "I'm About to Come Alive", originally recorded by Train on their 2003 album My Private Nation. Nail's version peaked at number 47 on the country chart. The second single, "Red Light," entered Top 40 in May 2009 and peaked at number 7. "Turning Home", which Chesney co-wrote with Scooter Carusoe, was the album's third single, reaching a peak of number 20.

In February 2011, Nail released his fifth single, "Let It Rain", which featured Sarah Buxton on guest vocals. It served as the lead-off single to his second studio album, The Sound of a Million Dreams, which was released on November 15, 2011. In January 2012, "Let It Rain" became Nail's first No. 1 hit. The title track was released as the album's second and final single, and reached a peak of number 38 on the Hot Country Songs chart.

Nail released a three-track digital EP titled 1979 on July 17, 2012. The EP includes a cover of Adele's "Someone like You".

I'm a Fire and Fighter (2013–2017)
A new single, "Whatever She's Got", was released to country radio on May 28, 2013. It served as the lead-off single to his third studio album, I'm a Fire, which was released on March 4, 2014. It reached number one on the Country Airplay chart in February 2014. The second single from the album was announced to be "Kiss You Tonight", co-written by David Cook, an American Idol winner.

On July 20, 2015, David Nail released a new single entitled "Night's on Fire." The song peaked at No. 14 on Country Airplay in July 2016, and served as the lead-off single to his fourth studio album Fighter.

In May 2016 he released an EP of covers titled 'Uncovered'. It included 'In The Ghetto', 'Can't Feel My Face', Phil Collins' 'In The Air Tonight' and Adele's 'Send My Love (To Your New Lover)'.

In September 2016, the album's second single, "Good at Tonight" featuring Brothers Osborne, was released to country radio. It failed to reach the Top 50 of the country charts and it was announced in early 2017 that David Nail had parted ways with MCA Nashville after 10 years with the label.

David Nail and The Well Ravens (2018–present)
In July 2018, Nail announced a new project as the frontman of the band David Nail & The Well Ravens. The band's first album titled Only This And Nothing More, was independently released on September 14, 2018.

Personal life
Nail was born and grew up in Kennett, Missouri, where his father was a high school band director. He married longtime girlfriend Catherine Werne on June 6, 2009, in Franklin, Tennessee. On December 12, 2015, Nail and Werne welcomed twins, son Lawson Brent Nail and daughter Lillian Catherine Nail.

They welcomed a baby girl, Ellie Britton, in 2020.

Nail participated in the 2010 Taco Bell All-Star Legends and Celebrity Softball Game, hitting a home run past the right-field fence in Angel Stadium.

He attended Arkansas State University where he was a member of Pi Kappa Alpha.

He is an avid fan of the MLB's St. Louis Cardinals and sang "God Bless America" during Game 7 of the Cardinals' 2011 World Series game versus the Texas Rangers.

He sang the National Anthem at the Mizzou Tigers 2012 homecoming football game versus the University of Kentucky.

Discography

Studio albums

Extended plays

Singles

A"Turning Home" did not enter the Hot 100, but peaked at number 17 on Bubbling Under Hot 100 Singles.
B"Kiss You Tonight" did not enter the Hot 100, but peaked at number 3 on Bubbling Under Hot 100 Singles.

Other charted songs

Music videos

Awards and nominations

References

External links
Official Site

1979 births
Living people
People from Kennett, Missouri
American country singer-songwriters
MCA Records artists
Singer-songwriters from Missouri
Mercury Records artists
Country musicians from Missouri
21st-century American singers